Mirko Bortoletti (born 19 November 1998) is an Italian professional footballer who plays as a midfielder for  club Chieri.

Career
Born in Milan, Bortoletti started his career in Pistoiese and Torino youth sector. As a senior, he was loaned to Serie D club Vis Pesaro in 2017–18 season.

In August 2018, he left Torino and signed with Serie D club Fidelis Andria.

For the 2019–20 seasons, he returned to Pistoiese in Serie C. Bortoletti made his professional debut on 25 August against AlbinoLeffe.

On 2 September 2020, he moved to Arezzo.

On 28 January 2021, he joined Serie C club Novara.

On 17 January 2022, he returned to Fidelis Andria.

On 23 July 2022, Bortoletti moved to Chieri in Serie D.

References

External links
 
 

1998 births
Living people
Footballers from Milan
Italian footballers
Association football midfielders
Serie C players
Serie D players
U.S. Pistoiese 1921 players
Torino F.C. players
Vis Pesaro dal 1898 players
S.S. Fidelis Andria 1928 players
S.S. Arezzo players
Novara F.C. players
A.S.D. Calcio Chieri 1955 players